Two warships of Sweden have been named Nordkaparen, after the North Atlantic right whale:

 , a Delfinen-class submarine launched in 1935 and stricken in 1958.
 , a  launched in 1961 and stricken in 1988.

Swedish Navy ship names